Sonia Nieto is a Professor Emerita of Language, Literacy and Culture at the University of Massachusetts Amherst, School of Education University of Massachusetts Amherst. With experience in teaching students at all levels and from many socioeconomic and cultural backgrounds, Nieto is an author who teaches in the field of multiculturalism. She has won several awards in her field, for instance, the 1997 Multicultural Educator of the Year award from the National Association for Multicultural Education, the 2005 Educator of the Year Award from the National Council of Teachers of English, and honorary doctorates from Lesley University (1999), Bridgewater State College (2004), and DePaul University (2007).

Nieto was raised in Brooklyn, New York, where she attended the public school systems until eventually attending St. Johns University where she received her B.S. in Elementary Education. Later, she studied abroad in Madrid, Spain, receiving her M.A. in Spanish and Hispanic Literature. In the following years she taught in Brooklyn and the Bronx until moving to Massachusetts and receiving her doctorate in curriculum studies with concentrations in multicultural and bilingual education, from the University of Massachusetts in 1979. In May 2017, Nieto delivered the commencement address for the Graduate School of Education at St. John's University in New York City, where she reflected on her life work and her undergraduate days at St. John's.

About her work 

In Nieto's book Affirming Diversity: The Sociopolitical Context of Multicultural Education (the fifth edition of which is co-authored by Patty Bode), Nieto takes an in-depth look into public school systems and describes how they fail to serve many students, particularly children of color and those who live in poverty. Her text often describes structural flaws in the education system and how to challenge them in the classroom. Her work can be regarded as a reference for teachers in a multicultural environment.

Affirming Diversity also includes multiple case studies of students of various sociocultural backgrounds so that teachers can learn from the voices and experiences of young people themselves. This resource can prove to be useful in a classroom setting.

Nieto's work seeks to shed light on common institutional policies and practices (racism, inequality, discrimination, and other forms of exclusion) in multicultural learning environments and to show teachers how to effectively confront these challenges. According to her, institutional policies and practices that jeopardize student learning are evident at many different levels: negative societal ideologies, inequitable power relationships, rigid national policies, unresponsive school districts, and even the biases and beliefs of teachers themselves.

Her books also offer activities both in the classroom and out that the teacher can engage in with students, colleagues, and community members to provide an enhanced learning environment. These activities usually seek to bring about positive change in the school, the community, and inside oneself. Her book also offers web resources for a multimedia learning experience.

Other publications 

Nieto has written dozens of journal articles and book chapters and is also author of several books (see "Works" below).

Nieto is also a signatory to the Support 4 Bill Ayers petition, which has been signed by more than 3000 academics.

Works 
  A compilation of previously published journal articles and book chapters.
 
 
 

 As editor

References

Sources 
 

Living people
Cultural academics
1943 births